Gabriel Brothers, Inc., (doing business as Gabe's) is an American department store retail chain headquartered in Morgantown, West Virginia, United States.
The company was incorporated in 1961 as Gabriel Brothers and renamed Gabe's in 2005. Gabe's is classified as an off-price store, selling clothes and footwear at prices generally lower than other major similar stores, and a variety store as it sells food and other types of general merchandise.

As of June 2022, Gabe's operates 122 stores in the United States, primarily in the Mid-Atlantic and Southeastern United States.

History

In the early 1920s, Zaghieb G. "Z.G." Gabriel began selling merchandise out of the back of a green-paneled truck he had outfitted with shelves and drawers. As he drove his mobile shop through the coal towns of Fayette County, Pennsylvania, he greeted and got to know his customers, seeing firsthand the need for inexpensive merchandise. Z.G. began to hop freight trains bound for New York City, taking empty duffle bags with him. There, he would buy up excess inventory from shops, returning with bags full of merchandise to sell at deep discounts.

In 1961, Z.G.'s two sons, James and Arthur, co-founded the Gabriel Brothers Stores in Morgantown, West Virginia. Through the 1980s and 1990s, the brothers led Gabe's through an expansion into various states including Maryland, Ohio, and Virginia. In 2005, new ownership rebranded the stores as "Gabe's".

As of June 2022, there are 122 store locations in Delaware, Georgia, Indiana, Kentucky, Maryland, New Jersey, New York, North Carolina, Ohio, Pennsylvania, South Carolina, Tennessee, Virginia, Michigan and West Virginia.

References

External links
 Official Website

Companies based in West Virginia
Discount stores of the United States
Companies based in Morgantown, West Virginia
American companies established in 1961
Retail companies established in 1961
1961 establishments in West Virginia